Calico crab may refer to:
Ovalipes ocellatus
Hepatus epheliticus

Animal common name disambiguation pages